Active was a ketch that was launched in 1850 and that wrecked at the entrance of the Hunter River in New South Wales on 18 February 1852.

References

Shipwrecks of the Hunter Region
Ships built in New South Wales
1850 ships
Maritime incidents in February 1852
1851–1870 ships of Australia
Merchant ships of Australia
Ketches of Australia